Shou-Lao (alternatively spelled Shao-Lao) is a fictional character appearing in American comic books published by Marvel Comics.

Publication history
Shou-Lao first appeared in 1974's Marvel Premiere #16 and was created by Len Wein, Roy Thomas, and Larry Hama.

Fictional character biography
Shou-Lao is an immortal Chinese dragon who became the source of power in K'un-L'un. During a performance of the dragon riders of K'un-Lun for the entertainment of its Yu-Ti, Shou-Lao went berserk and attacked the city's leader. He was slain by Quan-St'ar who cut out the dragon's heart. Enraged at this, Yu-Ti banished Quan-St'ar from the city and revived Shou-Lao by melting his heart and placing it in a sacred cavern. Following this incident, those who became Iron Fist had to accomplish the final test of defeating Shou-Lao in order to absorb part of his power. This was done over 66 times.

After she was busted for training three cavemen, Fan Fei was chained up and watched as the cavemen were fed to Shou-Lou by Lei Kung. When she broke out with the hope that she will die fighting Shou-Lou, Fan Fei punched Shou-Lou in his chest tattoo and gained his powers.

When Danny Rand was becoming the next Iron Fist, he defeated Shou-Lao by burning the dragon-shaped tattoo off his chest. After defeating Shou-Lao, Danny Rand plunged his hands into the brazier containing Shou-Lao's immortal heart and it charged him with the power of the Iron Fist.

Steel Serpent later attempted to fight Shou-Lao. When Steel Serpent failed to defeat Shou-Lao, Lei Kung found him weeping in the snow. He then took Steel Serpent back to the city.

During the Avengers vs. X-Men storyline, the X-Men fought the Avengers in K'un-L'un when Hope Summers and Lei-Kung arrive on the back of Shou-Lao who blasted the Phoenix Force-empowered Cyclops. Unfortunately, Shou-Lao was far too young to put up a fight and its riders were dislodged. However, Hope was able to unleash a combination of dragon energy, fire, and chaos magic to banish Cyclops to the Moon.

Powers and abilities
Shou-Lao have dragon powers (the ability to utilize wings for flying, breathe fire, change colors, live forever, and strike at lightning-fast speeds). In addition, he is super-strong and durable, as well as resistant to all types of diseases.

In other media

Television
 Shou-Lao appears in Ultimate Spider-Man, voiced by Mark Hamill. In the episode "Strange", Nightmare makes Iron Fist relive the fierce fight against Shou-Lao. With Spider-Man's help, Iron Fist breaks Nightmare's illusion by defeating Shou-Lao.
 Shou-Lao is featured in Iron Fist. He briefly appears in "Dragon Plays with Fire", during one of the flashbacks explaining how the titular character received the powers. Though only Shou-Lao's glowing red eyes are seen. Finn Jones, who portrays Iron Fist in the Netflix series Iron Fist, stated that Shou-Lao will be explained and referenced during season one after which the character will be more greatly explored in future seasons. In addition, Finn stated they could not show Shou-Lao onscreen due to budgetary constraints. In his own words, Finn stated "I’d love to have the budget for these shows to have a full-on Game of Thrones style dragon. But unfortunately you know, we have budget restraints. That’s the nature of the show." The episode "The City's Not for Burning" showed how Danny got the honor to face Shou-Lao where he turned the tide against Davos in a duel.
 The Defenders miniseries reveals that the bones of Shao-Lao's kind contain a substance that can bring people back from the dead. The Hand has been using it ever since they were banished from K'un-L'un centuries ago, but eventually have run out of it. This causes them to seek access to the remains of another dragon, buried deep underneath Hell's Kitchen, Manhattan which retroactively explains their goals in both seasons one and two of Daredevil. The Hand used Midland Circle Financial as a cover for their activity to harness the substance.

Video games
Shou-Lao appears in Lego Marvel Super Heroes 2. When Iron Fist, Ms. Marvel, and Spider-Man enter K'un-Lun's Cave of the Dragon while looking for a shard of the Nexus of All Realities, they find the shard embedded in Shou-Lao's as Steel Serpent controls Shou-Lao into attacking them. After Steel Serpent was defeated, Iron Fist removes the Nexus shard from Shou-Lao's heart.

References

Comics characters introduced in 1974
Fictional characters with fire or heat abilities
Fictional characters with immortality
Fictional characters with superhuman durability or invulnerability
Fictional dragons
Marvel Comics characters
Marvel Comics characters who can move at superhuman speeds
Marvel Comics characters with superhuman strength
Iron Fist (comics)
Characters created by Len Wein
Characters created by Roy Thomas
Characters created by Larry Hama